Vila Malanza is a village in Caué District on São Tomé Island in São Tomé and Príncipe. Its population is 550 (2012 census). Vila Malanza lies 1.5 km north of Porto Alegre and 17 km southwest of São João dos Angolares.

Population history

References

Populated places in Caué District
Populated coastal places in São Tomé and Príncipe